is a private women's junior college in Ōsaki, Miyagi, Japan, established in 1967. The predecessor of the school, a sewing school, was founded in 1881.

External links
 Official website 

Japanese junior colleges
Educational institutions established in 1881
Private universities and colleges in Japan
Universities and colleges in Miyagi Prefecture
1881 establishments in Japan
Women's universities and colleges in Japan
Ōsaki, Miyagi